S. Louisa Wei (born in Dongying, Shandong) (also credited as S. Louisa Wei) is a Chinese filmmaker, film producer, writer and professor.

Early life 

Louisa Wei was born in Dongying City of Shandong Province, but grew up in Xi'an. Her father was from one of the seven prominent families of the early 20th century in Fuzhou City of Fujian Province. The Wei family has one of the earliest overseas students of China, Wei Han (1851–1929), who studied ship building in France from 1875 to 1879 and was the earliest masters of ship building in China. Such a tradition of sending children to study overseas has continued over several generations in the Wei families. Wei studied comparative literature and film in Canada from 1992 to 1999, receiving her MA from Carleton University in 1994 and PhD from University of Alberta in 2002. After working in Japan for two years, Wei moved to Hong Kong and has been since teaching in School of Creative Media, City University of Hong Kong.

Film Works 
Wei began making documentaries in 2003. In February 2006, she made her first music documentary, Cui Jian: Rocking China, a 35-minute video in retrospection of Cui Jian’s performances from 1986 to 2005. The video was co-produced by Blue Queen Cultural Communicated Ltd. and EMI Music and broadcast on Channel 13 of Cable TV Hong Kong on 3 and 4 June 2006. She has continued to film Cui Jian to present time and a film titled Red Rock is in post-production.

In July 2006, she made her first feature documentary A Piece of Heaven: Primary Documents, a rather personal documentation of her very first documentary experience with Professor Situ Zhaodun of Beijing Film Academy. This film follows Situ's teaching of Hong Kong students in 2003 and 2005, but meanwhile constructs a brief biography of Situ through his family history. Shanghai-based director Peng Xiaolian speaks very highly of the work, calling it "lyrical prose of a family history shared by many in China, and a work with depth about the very concept of documentation through puzzle pieces of documentary history.”

Between 2003 and 2009, Wei co-produced, co-wrote, and co-directed a documentary with Shanghai-based director Xiaolian Peng titled Storm under the Sun. The film has both English and Chinese version with the same running time of 139-minutes. The film focuses on the 1955 national campaign initiated by chairman Mao Zedong and against Hu Feng, a leading literary critic at the time. Storm under the Sun is the first film representation of the case, which was a direct cause of the Anti-Rightest Movement two years later and still has a profound influence on Chinese intellectuals today. The film is a political saga with historical newsreel footages, woodcut prints and cartoons, authentic interviews and stylized animations. The film was first premiered at IDFA in Amsterdam in 2007, but its final version (both English and Chinese) was premiered at the 33rd Hong Kong International Film Festival in 2009, immediately attracting critical attention. The film is in the library collections of dozens of universities worldwide. The film was named as one of the best independent documentaries made in Hong Kong by scholars like Ian Aitken and Mike Ingham, and discussed in details in their book titled Hong Kong Documentary Film. The film was recently exhibited at Documentary Film Series "Turn It On: China on Film, 2000–2017" at Guggenheim Museum for ten weeks from 13 October 2017. This exhibition is curated by Ai Weiwei and Wang Fen.

From early 2009 to 2013, Wei collaborated with veteran Hong Kong filmmaker and critic Law Kar on a feature documentary titled Golden Gate Girls (a.k.a. Golden Gate Silver Light), which made its world premiere at the 37th Hong Kong International Film Festival on 1 April 2013. This work reflects the life and time of Esther Eng, Southern China's first woman director, who is a San Francisco native. The film immediately received a positive review from The Hollywood Reporter, and another report in this trade magazine of Hollywood claims that a film producer is inspired by the documentary and hopes to make a feature film around Esther Eng.

Golden Gate Girls traveled to many film festivals and international conferences, and Wei is recognized as a pioneer in documenting the once lost history of Esther Eng. As a researcher in Chinese cinema, she also contributed entries of Esther Eng and Pu Shuqing—China's first female scriptwriter to Women Film Pioneer Project hosted by Columbia University.

Wei made a TV documentary for RTHK in 2016 titled Wang Shiwei: The Buried Writer</ref>, which was first aired on 25 December 2016. The book was the winner of Distinguished Publishing Award (Literature and Fiction category) at The First Hong Kong Publishing Biennial Award and received positive reviews.

In 2018, Wei completed another documentary titled Havana Divas, which also documents a part of overseas Chinese history. Havana Divas and Golden Gate Girls have several shared characters: Esther Eng, Siu Yin Fei, Franco Yuen, Wu Chin-lee, and Danny Li Kei Fung. The film focuses on two Cuban ladies, Caridad Amaran (1931–) and Georgina Wong (1929–), who learned the art of Cantonese opera in Havana in the 1940s and toured around the country to perform. The film has been showing in Hong Kong since 11 February 2018 and is still going around the film festival circuit. It is a rare piece that brings together a Chinese art and two Cuban families, and a story shared by many immigrant families in Central and South Americas.

In 2019, Wei made a TV documentary titled Writing 10000 Miles for RTHK in its 2019 "Outstanding Chinese Writers" series</ref>, which was first aired on 13 January 2019. The episode, together with other episodes in the series, was awarded No. 4 in 2019's Hong Kong TV Appreciation Index.

Wei also has credits as a scriptwriter for two feature films released in 2007: Susie Au's Ming Ming and Xiao Feng's Gun of Mercy. She has also translated many feature film scripts for films during their productions. This list includes Mongol (2008), Lust, Caution (2007), Curse of the Golden Flower (2006), and Fearless (2006) among other films in production.

Written Works 
Wei's earlier books are mostly related to cinema subjects. Women's Film: Dialogue with Chinese and Japanese Female Directors (2009) was co-authored with Yang Yuanying, featuring interviews with 27 women film director of four generations working in Mainland China, Hong Kong, Taiwan and Japan. Her textbook titled Cinema East and West (2014) and published by City University of Hong Kong Press has a revised edition in 2016.

From her research on Esther Eng and other pioneer women filmmakers, she and Law Kar co-author a book in Chinese titled Esther Eng: Cross-ocean Filmmaking and Women Pioneers (2016), which won The Tenth Hong Kong Book Award in 2017.

Also in 2016, Wei published a book in Chinese titled Wang Shiwei: A Reform in Thinking in 2016.

In 2017, Wei published Hu Feng: Poetic Ideals, Political Storm based on her extended research on the Hu Feng case.

References

External links

www.bqcc.com Blue Queen Cultural Communication
S. Louisa Wei School of Creative Media, City University of Hong Kong, S. Louisa Wei
Havana Divas Havana Divas IMDB
Golden Gate Girls Golden Gate Girls IMDB

Year of birth missing (living people)
Living people
Film directors from Shandong
Writers from Dongying
Screenwriters from Shandong
Chinese women film directors
Educators from Shandong